Liberal arts is an academic program in Western higher education, which traditionally covers the natural sciences, social sciences, arts, and humanities.

 Liberal Arts (film), a 2012 film directed by Josh Radnor
 Liberal Arts, Inc., a former American corporation founded in 1946